Patrick Dignan may refer to:
 Patrick Dignan (politician) (1814–1894), New Zealand member of parliament
 Patrick Dignan (British Army officer) (1920–2012), British director of army surgery